Russ Schoene (pronounced SHAY-nee; born April 16, 1960) is a retired American professional basketball player and former assistant men's basketball coach at the University of Washington.

Schoene starred at the University of Tennessee at Chattanooga, where the 6-10 forward led the team to two straight Southern Conference championships (1981 and 1982) and an NCAA tournament appearance in 1982.  As a senior, he averaged 13.6 points and 7 rebounds a game, and earned league tournament MVP honors.

The Philadelphia 76ers selected Schoene in the second round of the 1982 NBA draft (45th pick overall). The 76ers traded him to the Indiana Pacers during his rookie campaign; he stayed in Indianapolis until the end of the 1983-84 season.

During the 1984–85 and 1985-86 seasons, Schoene played for Olimpia Simac Milano of the Italian league, where his teammates included former Los Angeles Lakers head coach Mike D'Antoni and former NBA All-Star Joe Barry Carroll.  The team won the Korać Cup in 1985, and Schoene was named the Italian League MVP in 1986.

On October 2, 1986, the Seattle SuperSonics acquired the rights to Schoene, along with guard Terence Stansbury and "future considerations," in return for guard John Long.  Schoene made the Sonics squad, and spent the next three seasons with the team.  As a designated off-the-bench shooter in Seattle, he earned the nickname "Catch and Shoot," firing a career-high 38.2% from three-point range in 1988-89.  He scored a career-high 20 points on three occasions.  Arguably his best NBA game was on April 24, 1988, when he had 20 points, four rebounds, a steal, an assist, and no turnovers in 33 minutes against the Los Angeles Clippers. Schoene wore #40 as a Sonic.

Following the 1988-89 season, he accepted a three-year, $2.4 million contract offer to play for Glaxo Verona in the Italian League.  He played in Italy for five seasons, and led Glaxo Verona to win the Coppa Italia trophy in 1991.  In 1993, the Sacramento Kings waived him prior to the start of the season.  At the end of his professional career, he spent time with the Rapid City Thrillers of the Continental Basketball Association.

His career NBA statistics include 1,491 points (5.1 ppg), 735 rebounds (2.5 rpg), and 175 assists (0.6 apg).

Schoene joined the Washington Huskies
men's basketball coaching staff in 2002, following five years as an assistant at Bellevue Community College.  He left the team to focus on Samurai Sam's following the 2003-04 campaign.

In 2005 Schoene joined the coaching staff at The Bear Creek School in Redmond, Washington, where he has helped lead the team to numerous league championships, tri-district championships, and 2 state play-off appearances.

References

1960 births
Living people
American expatriate basketball people in Italy
American men's basketball coaches
American men's basketball players
Basketball coaches from Illinois
Basketball players from Illinois
Chattanooga Mocs men's basketball players
High school basketball coaches in Washington (state)
Indiana Pacers players
Junior college men's basketball coaches in the United States
Junior college men's basketball players in the United States
Mineral Area College alumni
Olimpia Milano players
People from Clinton County, Illinois
Philadelphia 76ers draft picks
Philadelphia 76ers players
Power forwards (basketball)
Rapid City Thrillers players
Scaligera Basket Verona players
Seattle SuperSonics players
Sportspeople from Greater St. Louis
Virtus Bologna players
Washington Huskies men's basketball coaches